Crestwood High School or CHS is a public, magnet high school in Dearborn Heights, Michigan. It was founded in 1960 and is located on Beech Daly Road between Ford Road and Cherry Hill Road. It is a part of the Crestwood School District.

Athletics
CHS students are involved in numerous sports throughout all three seasons.

Fall Sports
Football
Girls Volleyball
Girls Swimming
Girls Golf
Boys Soccer
Cross Country
Boys Tennis

Winter Sports
Boys Basketball
Girls Basketball
Boys Swimming
Boys Bowling
Girls Bowling
Wrestling

Spring Sports
Baseball
Softball
Girls Tennis
Track and Field
Girls Soccer
Boys Golf

CHS is a member of the Western Wayne Athletic Conference.

Notable alumni
Garrett Clayton - actor and singer
David Knezek - politician 
Robert L. McKenzie - a domestic and foreign policy analyst, public commentator, and scholar of the Middle East and North Africa
Pete Stoyanovich - NFL football placekicker 
Chris Tamer - NHL hockey player 
Gary Wayne - Major League Baseball pitcher

References

Dearborn Heights, Michigan
Public high schools in Michigan
Schools in Wayne County, Michigan
1960 establishments in Michigan
Educational institutions established in 1960